Chen De (born 26 November 1949) is a Chinese FIDE master chess player. 

Chen De plays for the Guangdong chess club in the China Chess League (CCL).

National championships
In 1974 and 1977, Chen De won the Chinese Chess Championship.

National team
He was a member of the Chinese national chess team. He competed at the Chess Olympiad in 1978, the first time China competed. This was his only appearance at this prestigious event, and he played 9 games in total, scoring 1 win, 3 draws and 5 losses.

Chang also competed for the national team at the Men's Asian Team Chess Championship (the most prestigious team chess tournament in Asia) three times between 1977 and 1981. He played 17 games in all, scoring 12 wins, 3 draws and 2 losses.

International arbiter
In July 2004, he qualified for the title of International Arbiter.

See also
Chess in China

References

External links

1949 births
Living people
Chinese chess players
Chess FIDE Masters
Chess arbiters